Motiv Liebe is a German television series.

See also
List of German television series

External links
 

1972 German television series debuts
German crime television series
German drama television series
German legal television series
German-language television shows
Das Erste original programming